Charles Émile Picard  (24 July 1856 – 11 December 1941) was a French mathematician. He was elected the fifteenth member to occupy seat 1 of the Académie française in 1924.

Life

He was born in Paris on 24 July 1856 and educated there at the Lycée Henri-IV. He then studied mathematics at the École Normale Supérieure.

Picard's mathematical papers, textbooks, and many popular writings exhibit an extraordinary range of interests, as well as an impressive mastery of the mathematics of his time. Picard's little theorem states that every nonconstant entire function takes every value in the complex plane, with perhaps one exception. Picard's great theorem states that an analytic function with an essential singularity takes every value infinitely often, with perhaps one exception, in any neighborhood of the singularity. He made important contributions in the theory of differential equations, including work on Picard–Vessiot theory, Painlevé transcendents and his introduction of a kind of symmetry group for a linear differential equation. He also introduced the Picard group in the theory of algebraic surfaces, which describes the classes of algebraic curves on the surface modulo linear equivalence. In connection with his work on function theory, he was one of the first mathematicians to use the emerging ideas of algebraic topology. In addition to his theoretical work, Picard made contributions to applied mathematics, including the theories of telegraphy and elasticity. His collected papers run to four volumes.

Louis Couturat studied integral calculus with Picard in 1891-1892, taking detailed notes of the lectures. These notes were preserved and now are available in three cahiers from Internet Archive.

Like his contemporary, Henri Poincaré, Picard was much concerned with the training of mathematics, physics, and engineering students.
He wrote a classic textbook on analysis and one of the first textbooks on the theory of relativity. Picard's popular writings include biographies of many leading French mathematicians, including his father in law, Charles Hermite.

Family

In 1881 he married Marie, the daughter of Charles Hermite.

Works
 1891–96: 
 1905: 
 1906 : (with Georges Simart) Theorie des Fonctions Algebrique de deux Variables Independente volume 2, via Internet Archive
 1922: 
 1922: 
 1931: 
 1978–81:

See also
 Émile Picard Medal
 Picard modular group
 Picard modular surface
 Picard horn

References

External links

 
 
 

1856 births
1941 deaths
Scientists from Paris
19th-century French mathematicians
20th-century French mathematicians
Lycée Henri-IV alumni
École Normale Supérieure alumni
Mathematical analysts
Grand Croix of the Légion d'honneur
Members of the Académie Française
Members of the French Academy of Sciences
Foreign Members of the Royal Society
Members of the Pontifical Academy of Sciences
Members of the Hungarian Academy of Sciences
Fellows of the American Academy of Arts and Sciences
Foreign associates of the National Academy of Sciences
Corresponding members of the Saint Petersburg Academy of Sciences
Honorary Members of the Russian Academy of Sciences (1917–1925)
Grand Crosses of the Order of Saint James of the Sword
Members of the Ligue de la patrie française
Members of the Royal Society of Sciences in Uppsala